Inés Remersaro Coronel (born December 2, 1992) is an Olympic backstroke swimmer from Uruguay.

Remersaro competed at the 2011 Pan American Games in the Women's 100 metre backstroke and at the Women's 200 metre backstroke, finishing 20th and 16th respectively.

She also competed at the 2012 Summer Olympics in the Women's 100 metre backstroke, finishing in 43rd place in the heats, failing to qualify for the semifinals.

In 2019, she represented Uruguay at the 2019 World Aquatics Championships held in Gwangju, South Korea. She competed in the women's 50 metre freestyle and women's 100 metre freestyle events. In both events she did not advance to compete in the semi-finals.

References

External links

Uruguayan female swimmers
1992 births
Living people
Sportspeople from Montevideo
Olympic swimmers of Uruguay
Swimmers at the 2011 Pan American Games
Swimmers at the 2015 Pan American Games
Swimmers at the 2012 Summer Olympics
Swimmers at the 2016 Summer Olympics
Pan American Games competitors for Uruguay
Female backstroke swimmers
Swimmers at the 2019 Pan American Games